Southern Nights/Basic covers the complete Southern Nights and Basic albums and adds three bonus tracks.

Track listing
 "Southern Nights" (Allen Toussaint) - 2:59
 "This Is Sarah's Song" (Jimmy Webb) - 2:34
 "For Cryin' Out Loud" (Micheal Smotherland) - 3:0-4
 "God Only Knows" (Brian Wilson/Tony Asher) - 3:20
 "Sunflower" (Neil Diamond) - 2:51
 "Guide Me" (John Jennings) - 2:25
 "Early Morning Song" (Jimmy Webb) - 3:33
 "(I'm Getting) Used to The Crying" (Roger Miller/Micheal Smotherman) - 2:48
 "Let Go" (Brian Cadd) - 3:30
 "How High Did We Go" (Medlin/Albright) - 3:05
 "(You've Got To) Sing It Loud For Me Sonny" (Michael Smotherman/M. Durham) - 2:46
 "Stranger In The Mirror" (Micheal Smotherman) - 3:45
 "Can You Fool" (Micheal Smotherman) - 3:09
 "I See Love" (Micheal Smotherman) - 2:14
 "(When I Feel Like) I Got No Love In Me" (Micheal Smotherman) - 3:25
 "Love Takes You Higher" (Micheal Smotherman) - 2:41
 "Never Tell Me No Lies" (Micheal Smotherman) - 2:20
 "I'm Gonna Love You" (Micheal Smotherman) - 3:22
 "California" (Micheal Smotherman) - 3:33
 "Let's All Sing A Song About It" (M. Smotherman/B. Burnette) - 3:14
 "Grafhaidh Me Thu" (Micheal Smotherman) - 2:39
 "Another Fine Mess" (Paul Williams) - 2:30
 "Arkansas" (M. Torok/R. Redd) - 2:38
 "You've Still Got a Place in My Heart" (Leon Payne) - 2:27

Production
 Producers - Gary Klein, Tom Thacker, Dennis Lambert, Brian Potter, Al De Lory, Glen Campbell
 Compiled by Glenn A. Baker, Peter Shillito, Kevin Mueller, Ian McFarlane
 Artwork by Greg Klein, Allen Duffy
 Mastered by Warren Bennett, The Raven Lab
 Photographs from The Glenn A. Baker Archives

2003 compilation albums
Glen Campbell compilation albums